Louis Gideon du Preez Venter (born ) is a South African rugby union player for  in the Currie Cup and the Rugby Challenge. His regular position is scrumhalf.

References

South African rugby union players
Living people
1994 births
Rugby union players from Pretoria
Rugby union scrum-halves
Free State Cheetahs players
Griffons (rugby union) players
Griquas (rugby union) players